Stein Ingebrigtsen (born 23 August 1945) is a Norwegian singer. He was enormously popular in Norway in the 1970s, nicknamed "Mr. Norsktoppen" for his countless hits topping Norsktoppen, an official chart for music in Norwegian.

Biography 
From the 1960s and through the 1970s, he sold more than one million albums, most of his songs being Norwegian translations of classics and famous pop songs of that period. Ingebrigtsen was heavily involved in the Treff-series ("Treff" being a direct Norwegian translation of "hit") which by 1978 finally comprised 21 discs consisting of translations of popular foreign songs. Among his hits were Norwegian versions of "Only You (and You Alone)" ("Bare du") and "It Never Rains in Southern California" ("Solen skinner alltid der du aller helst vil være"). After this, Ingebrigtsen stepped down his own musical activity and only sporadic releases such as Stjernetegn and Soldatenes kortstokk in 1988 and 1989. He continued working as a producer for other musicians. Ingebrigtsen released Edelstein – de 20 beste in 2001.

He is the father of pop-singer Christian Ingebrigtsen, who is a member of the England-based boy band A1.

He also sang in German.

Discography

Albums released in Norway
1972 – Hello-A (with Inger Lise Rypdal)
1973 – Bare Stein
1974 – Tilbake til naturen
1975 – Stein
1977 – Soloppgang

Albums released in Sweden
1972 – Sjung bort bekymren (with Inger Lise Rypdal)
1973 – Bara Stein
1975 – Tänk at få den tiden åter
1978 – Med säkra kort (best of)

References

Norwegian male singers
Melodi Grand Prix contestants
Living people
1945 births